Falcatifolium taxoides is a species of conifer in the family Podocarpaceae. It is found only in New Caledonia, and is the only known host of its non-photosynthetic, possibly parasitic relative, Parasitaxus usta.

Etymology
Falcatifolium means 'with sickle-shaped leaves', while taxoides means 'yew-like' (resembling Taxus).

References

Podocarpaceae
Least concern plants
Endemic flora of New Caledonia
Trees of New Caledonia
Taxonomy articles created by Polbot
Taxa named by Jean Antoine Arthur Gris
Taxa named by Adolphe-Théodore Brongniart
Taxa named by David John de Laubenfels